Michele Bravi (born 19 December 1994) is an Italian pop singer, songwriter and actor. He rose to fame after winning the seventh season of the Italian X Factor. His coronation song, "La vita e la felicità", was penned by Tiziano Ferro and reached the top spot of the Italian Singles Chart. Bravi's debut album, A passi piccoli, was released in June 2014.

In 2015, after parting ways with Sony Music, he released the EP I Hate Music, which entered the Italian Albums chart at number 3. In 2017, Bravi participated at the Sanremo Music Festival,  with the song "Il diario degli errori", anticipation of his debut number one album Anime di carta. After acting on Italian TV series La compagnia del Cigno, he published his second number one album La geografia del buio in 2021 with the single "Mantieni il bacio".

Since his career debut Bravi has sold over 300.000 copies in Italy reaching the Top ten Charts six times, including two number one. He received two MTV Italian Music Awards, collaborated with numerous Italian artists, including Giorgia, Gué Pequeno, Federica Abbate, Elodie and Tiziano Ferro, and the British singer James Blunt.

Career
Michele Bravi was born on 19 December 1994 in Città di Castello, a city in the province of Perugia, in Central Italy, to Giovanna Machi and Stefano Bravi. He has a sister, Marta, who is three years older than him.
He started singing as a child, when he joined the city choir, but he later decided to quit. During his studies at the liceo classico, Bravi's interest in music persisted, even if it was just a hobby. He later started to take music lessons, and he learnt to play piano.

In 2013, Bravi auditioned for the seventh edition of the Italian talent show X Factor, performing Cat Steven's "Father and Son". After being chosen by Morgan as a contestant for his category, "Boys Under 25", Bravi reached the final of the competition and, on 12 December 2013, won the competition, beating runner-up band Ape Escape. During the competition, Bravi performed the song "La vita e la felicità", co-written by Tiziano Ferro, which was later released as his debut single. During its second week, the single reached the top spot of the Italian Singles Chart.
The song was also included in the extended play with the same title, released by Sony Music on 13 December 2013.

In February 2014, Bravi took part in the soundtrack of the film Sotto una buona stella, directed by Carlo Verdone, recording the song with the same title. "Sotto una buona stella" was also released as Bravi's second single. Bravi's first studio album, A passi piccoli, was released on 10 June 2014. The album, which includes tracks written by Giorgia, Tiziano Ferro, Emilio Munda, Federico Zampaglione and James Blunt, also spawned the singles "Un giorno in più" and "In bilico".

Having left Sony for Universal Music, Bravi in 2015 started a YouTube channel to attain a closer contact with his fans. During the year he started recording new songs and in October his EP I Hate Music was published. It was preceded by the single "The Days". All songs were co-written by Bravi and the lyrics are in English. The EP contains the Troye Sivan cover "The Fault in Our Stars", as well. In early 2016, the singer started his first concert tour.<ref>{{cite web|url=http://www.rockol.it/news-650979/michele-bravi-i-hate-music-tour-2016-date-biglietti|title=Concerti, Michele Bravi: lI hate music tour 2016' al via a fine febbraio da Roma|work=Rockol.it|date=29 December 2015|accessdate=1 March 2016}}</ref>

In February 2017, Bravi competed in the "Big Artists" section of the 67th Sanremo Music Festival, performing the song "Il diario degli errori". The song was the lead single from Bravi's second studio album, Anime di carta, released on 24 February 2017. The album peaked the Italian Albums Chart and the song reached the number four of Italian Singles Chart receiving the double platinum certification.  His second lead single from the album "Solo per un po'" won the Best Performance Award at the MTV Italian Music Awards.

From October 2017 to May 2017 he was cast with Annalisa and Giovanni Caccamo as tutors of seventeen season of Amici di Maria De Filippi. In 2018 the singer collaborated with Elodie and rapper Gué Pequeno on the Top ten hit Nero Bali, which sold over 100,000 copies. In January 2019 he starred on Italian TV series "La compagnia del Cigno". 

On February 18, 2020, he announced the future release of hid third studio album. In May 2020 he was cast for the spin-off Amici Speciali with his lead sing from the album le "La vita breve dei coriandoli". In January 2021, Bravi published the second single "Mantieni il bacio" and the album La geografia del buio. The album became his second number one on Italian Albums Chart, while the single was certified gold by Fimi. On June 22, 2021, the singer released the collaboration "Falene" with British band Sophie and the Giants. 

Personal life
In January 2017, interviewed by Vanity Fair'', Bravi revealed he had a relationship with a man. The couple dated for two years before splitting. Bravi refused to label his sexuality in any way: "I don't need to come out, because there's no teen that would be surprised knowing I fell in love with a boy, and I think nobody of my same age would retreat feeling emotions for someone of the same sex". He also stated: "I met someone who gave me emotions, it's irrelevant he was a man. In the future, the same thing could happen with a girl".

In November 2018, Bravi allegedly caused a fatal car accident that left a 58-year-old motorcyclist dead.

Discography

Albums

EPs

Singles

Album appearances

Filmography

Awards and nominations

References

External links

 

1994 births
21st-century Italian singers
Living people
Italian pop singers
Italian YouTubers
People from Città di Castello
The X Factor winners
X Factor (Italian TV series) contestants
Italian LGBT musicians